Kabir Padavali (Kabir Songbook) is a song cycle for soprano and orchestra set to the poetry of the Indian mystic Kabir by the American composer Christopher Rouse.  The work was commissioned by the Minnesota Orchestra for the soprano Dawn Upshaw.  It was first performed by Upshaw and the Minnesota Orchestra under the direction of David Zinman in Minneapolis on January 6, 1999.  The piece is dedicated to the composer's son, Adrian Rouse.

Composition

Background
Rouse first encountered the work of Kabir while studying North Indian classical music in the early 1970s.  In 1972, Rouse composed a different piece for soprano and orchestra titled Kabir Padavali, which was never performed.  Over two decades later, a commission from the Minnesota Orchestra provided him the chance to re-explore Kabir's poetry.  Rouse started the composition on the new piece in 1997 and completed it at his home in Pittsford, New York, on January 12, 1998.

Rouse selected six poems on which to set his music from translations of Kabir's poetry by Linda Hess, Robert Bly, and Rabindranath Tagore.  Linda Hess and Douglas Brooks later provided the composer with transliterations for the text from Sanskrit.

Though the music is sang in Hindi, Rouse otherwise elected not to compose the piece in the style of Hindu music.  He reflected in the score program notes:

Structure
Kabir Padavali has a duration of approximately 28 minutes and is cast in six movements:
Bijak shabda 69
Tagore 50
Bijak sabda 55
Bijak sabda 4
Tagore 92
Tagore 97

Instrumentation
The work is scored for solo soprano and an orchestra consisting of two flutes (2nd doubling piccolo), two oboes, two clarinets, two bassoons, four horns, two trumpets, three trombones, tuba, timpani, three percussionists, celesta, accordion, harp, and strings.

Reception

Critical response
Kabir Padavali has been praised by music critics.  Reviewing the world premiere, Michael Anthony of the Star Tribune called it "an ear-catching, evocative piece" and wrote, "Rouse doesn't try to reproduce ragas or Hindi vocal styles, though he uses occasional drones throughout the cycle. His goal seems to be more the creation of an exotic atmosphere than an exercise in ethnomusicology... the results are striking and beautiful throughout, from the sensuous oboe theme at the beginning (which returns at the end), to the subtle interweaving of voice and flute in the second song, to the rapturous tone of the final pages: the voice humming while the percussion makes sounds like those of rattlesnakes."  The piece was later praised by Priscilla McLean of the Times Union and Geraldine Freedman of The Daily Gazette, who described the score as "complex, colorful, and rhythmically and harmonically multi-layered."

Awards
A recording of Kabir Padavali, performed by the soprano Talise Trevigne and Albany Symphony Orchestra, was nominated for the 2016 Grammy Award for Best Classical Vocal Solo.

References

Compositions by Christopher Rouse
1998 compositions
Classical song cycles
Compositions for symphony orchestra
Music commissioned by the Minnesota Orchestra